The 2013 NASCAR Nationwide Series was the 32nd season of the Nationwide Series, a stock car racing series sanctioned by the NASCAR in the United States. The season was contested over thirty-three races and started on February 23, 2013 at Daytona International Speedway, with the DRIVE4COPD 300, and ended on November 16 with the Ford EcoBoost 300 at Homestead-Miami Speedway. Austin Dillon of Richard Childress Racing won the Drivers' Championship, becoming the first driver in the three major NASCAR series to do so without recording a win. The No. 22 entry of Penske Racing won the Owners' Championship, while Ford won the Manufacturers' Championship.

Teams and drivers

Complete schedule

Limited schedule

Driver changes
The 2013 season sees significant driver changes. With Nationwide champion Ricky Stenhouse Jr. moving to the Sprint Cup Series with Roush Fenway Racing, Trevor Bayne, who ran a partial Nationwide schedule with Roush, inherited the No. 6 Ford for 2013. Runner-up Elliott Sadler announced his departure from Richard Childress Racing in 2012, and signed to drive for Joe Gibbs Racing full-time in the No. 11 Toyota. In addition to Sadler, Brian Vickers, after running a partial Cup schedule, return to the Nationwide Series full-time for the first time since his championship season in 2003. JGR's former driver Brian Scott took over Elliott Sadler's old No. 2 ride at RCR, signing a multi-year deal with the team. Truck Series driver Parker Kligerman signed with Kyle Busch Motorsports for 2013, driving the No. 77 Toyota for the season. Former Sprint Cup driver Regan Smith drove the full season for JR Motorsports in the No. 7, replacing Danica Patrick. Kasey Kahne and his USAC driver Brad Sweet also moved from Turner Motorsports to JRM, sharing the No. 5 Camaro for the season. TriStar Motorsports fielded a car for Louisiana native Hal Martin, running for Rookie of the Year. Jeffrey Earnhardt, after driving a limited schedule, drove the full season with Go Green Racing.

Schedule
The final calendar was released on November 13, 2012, containing 33 races.

Schedule changes
On October 5, 2012, Circuit Gilles Villeneuve's promoter François Dumontier announced that the series would not return to the circuit for the 2013 season. The event was later replaced by Mid-Ohio Sports Car Course located in Lexington, Ohio.

Changes

Rule changes
After banning all testing on tracks where any of the three premier series sanction races  in 2008, NASCAR announced on September 29, 2012, that they will implement limited testing at tracks which sanction a race on the schedule. However, NASCAR stated that each team would only be allowed to test two different times, with each test at a different track.  Rookie of the Year participants will also be allowed one extra test session, while NASCAR will choose two other events for extra testing during the race weekend. NASCAR also announced that the Nationwide Series's grid would decrease from 43 cars to 40.

Season summary
The Nationwide Series kicked off the 2013 season at Daytona International Speedway in the DRIVE4COPD 300. Following a big crash with 14 laps to go that resulted in a red flag, Regan Smith took the lead, attempting to take his second consecutive win. On the final lap, Smith attempted to block a pass attempt by Brad Keselowski and got turned into the outside wall, causing a big crash behind. Stewart drove to the inside and won his seventh career Daytona Nationwide race. However, the win was overshadowed by the last lap crash. Kyle Larson, who was collected into the crash, had his car lift off the ground and slam into the safety fence. The car's engine and front wheels landed in the grandstands, injuring 33 fans (all of whom survived).

The series moved out west to Phoenix International Raceway. The race would be dominated by Joe Gibbs Racing drivers Kyle Busch, Matt Kenseth, and Brian Vickers. While Kenseth and Vickers had separate incidents taking them out of contention, Busch rallied from an early speeding penalty and drove to his first Nationwide win since 2011. The series made its lone stop at the Las Vegas Motor Speedway the following week. With Cup contenders Keselowski and Dale Earnhardt Jr. having multiple issues throughout the day, Nationwide regular Sam Hornish Jr. pulled away from Kyle Busch in the closing laps to capture his first win of the season. Heading to the first short track of the season at Bristol, Kyle Busch once again dominated the race, leading 156 laps and holding off rookie Kyle Larson on the last lap for his second win of the season. Heading out west to the Auto Club Speedway, Kyle Busch would once again dominate the race weekend from the pole, easily winning his second consecutive race of the season and JGR's 9th consecutive win at ACS.

Following another off week, the Nationwide Series rolled into Texas Motor Speedway. Nationwide points leader Sam Hornish Jr. had the fastest car of the night, but contact with Jeremy Clements took Hornish out of contention. Kyle Busch took over the lead and easily won his third consecutive race of the season. The following week at Richmond International Raceway, the race would be dominated by Cup regulars Kevin Harvick, Kyle Busch, and polesitter Brad Keselowski. The three swapped the lead throughout the night, with Busch and Harvick's cars fading in the closing laps. Keselowski made a late pass on Harvick and went on to capture his first win of the 2013 season. The teams then headed south to Talladega Superspeedway. Joey Logano would dominate the race and looked set to win another plate race. With the race cut to 110 laps due to impending darkness, Regan Smith, with help from JR Motorsports teammate Kasey Kahne, stormed past Logano in a three wide finish on the final lap. Though Kahne beat Smith to the start finish line, Smith was ahead of his teammate at the scoring loop, handing him his first win of the season as well as the points lead. The night race at Darlington Raceway would be dominated by JGR. Pole winner Kyle Busch dominated the race, leading 107 laps and holding off teammates Elliott Sadler and Brian Vickers to take his 5th win of the season. Austin Dillon started on pole for the History 300 at Charlotte Motor Speedway, but Kyle Busch once again dominated. Busch led the most laps and took his 2nd consecutive win (his 6th of the season).

At Dover International Speedway, Kyle Busch once again dominated the race, looking for his 7th win of the season. A call for four tires late in the race proved to be his undoing and sent him outside the top-10. Joey Logano, who had won the previous year's race with Joe Gibbs Racing, inherited the lead and went on to win. The first stand-alone weekend for the Nationwide Series came at Iowa Speedway. Polesitter Austin Dillon dominated the race that had been pushed back from Saturday to Sunday and interrupted due to rain. However, Trevor Bayne would chase down Dillon and pass him before the race was declared official on lap 207, handing Bayne his first win of the season. The Nationwide Series headed north to Michigan International Speedway. Fuel mileage was key to winning the race, and points leader Regan Smith would take the lead over Parker Kligerman with 13 laps to go, and held off rookie Kyle Larson to take his second win of the season. Heading to the first road course of the season at Road America, polesitter A. J. Allmendinger would dominate most of the race, holding off Justin Allgaier on a green-white-checkered finish to earn his first win in NASCAR. The following week at Kentucky Speedway, the race would be dominated by Cup regulars Kyle Busch and Brad Keselowski. Though Busch would lead the most laps, Keselowski emerged with the dominant car of the night, being declared the race winner after the race was called due to rain on lap 170. The Nationwide Series made its return to Daytona the following week. The Penske duo of Sam Hornish and Joey Logano would be dominant throughout most of the race. However, Sprint Cup regular Matt Kenseth, with help from James Buescher, worked his way to the front and held off the field for the win.

At Loudon, Kyle Busch would once again dominate the race, but would have to survive a late red flag, as well as three green-white-checkered finishes to return to victory lane. At Chicagoland, defending winner Elliott Sadler had the dominant car, looking to turn his season around. However, Sam Hornish Jr. would rally from an early speeding penalty to take the lead from Sadler, only to be passed by teammate Joey Logano, who held on to take his second win of the season. At Indianapolis, pole-sitter Kyle Busch dominated the race, leading 92 of 100 laps and holding off Brian Scott to win his eighth race of the year. The series then returned to Iowa. Despite polesitter Austin Dillon dominating the race, Cup driver Brad Keselowski would rally twice in the race, first from a pit road penalty, then an overheating issue. Though both Dillon and Keselowski took four tires during the final round of pitstops at lap 200, Keselowski would charge through the field and take his third win of the season. At Watkins Glen, Keselowski and Penske Racing teammate Sam Hornish Jr. dominated the race, and Keselowski won his second consecutive Nationwide race.

At Bristol, Kyle Busch started from the pole, and led 228 of 250 laps to win. Kevin Harvick held off Kyle Busch to win at Atlanta the following week. The Nationwide Series made its return to Richmond for its 1,000th race. Polesitter Brian Scott dominated the field, leading 239 of 250 laps. However, on the final restart, Scott spun his tires, handing the lead over to Brad Keselowski who held him and Regan Smith off for the win, as well as the 19th consecutive time that Cup regulars had won at Richmond. The series then returned to Chicagoland Speedway, where Kyle Busch led 195 of 200 laps to take his tenth win of the season.

The Nationwide Series then held its final stand alone race of the year at Kentucky. Truck series regular Ryan Blaney would dominate the field, easily taking his first career win. Returning to Dover, multiple pit strategies were the order of the day. While Trevor Bayne decided to pit on lap 25 Joey Logano and others decided to pit on lap 40. Kyle Busch, who was taken out of contention due to pit strategy, decided to max out his cars fuel mileage to lap 86. However, he was forced to pit under the green flag, costing him the win. Logano would take back the lead from Busch on lap 142 and would win his fourth consecutive Dover Nationwide race. The series made the final Midwestern stop at Kansas Speedway, where the race would be dominated by Regan Smith, hoping to put himself back in the championship hunt. However, Matt Kenseth's team would make a late call to pit for two tires, forcing him to conserve fuel. However, contact between Kyle Busch and Brad Keselowski, whose respective cars were fighting for the owner's championship, late in the race caused a caution. On the following restart, Kenseth pulled away for his second Nationwide win of the year. The teams then headed home to Charlotte Motor Speedway. Championship contender Sam Hornish Jr. dominated the early stages of the race with a fast car. Despite an early two-tire stop by Matt Kenseth, Hornish returned to the lead until the middle stages of the race, when Regan Smith took the lead after a round of pit stops. Rookie Kyle Larson used the outside lane to pass Smith and lead until lap 163. A slow stop by Larson's crew handed the lead to polesitter Kyle Busch. Despite Hornish reeling in Busch after the restart, his car faded over the long run, allowing Busch to retake the lead with seven laps to go and sail to his eleventh win of the season. In the second Texas race, Alex Bowman won the pole for the 2nd straight Texas race but Sprint Cup driver Brad Keselowski dominated the race on his way to 7th win of the season. At Phoenix, Kyle Busch dominated from the pole and held off Justin Allgaier to sweep the Phoenix races in 2013. Austin Dillon and Sam Hornish Jr were separated by 8 points heading into the final race. At the season finale at Homestead, Sam Hornish Jr won the pole and was trailing Austin Dillon by 8 points. He and fellow Nationwide regular Kyle Larson dominated but Brad Keselowski passed Larson on fresher tires with less than 10 laps to go to score his eighth win of the season. Austin Dillon would finish twelfth and win the championship by 3 points despite not winning a race all season.

Results and standings

Races

Drivers' standings

(key) Bold - Pole position awarded by time. Italics - Pole position set by final practice results or rainout. * – Most laps led.

1 – Post entry, driver and owner did not score points.
2 – Landon Cassill started receiving Nationwide points at Charlotte.
3 – Harrison Rhodes started receiving Nationwide points at Dover.

Manufacturer

See also
 2013 NASCAR Sprint Cup Series
 2013 NASCAR Camping World Truck Series
 2013 NASCAR K&N Pro Series East
 2013 NASCAR K&N Pro Series West
 2013 ARCA Racing Series
 2013 NASCAR Canadian Tire Series
 2013 NASCAR Toyota Series
 2013 NASCAR Whelen Euro Series

References

NASCAR Xfinity Series seasons